Chalarus proprius is a species of fly in the family Pipunculidae.

Distribution
Netherlands, Great Britain.

References

Pipunculidae
Insects described in 1992
Diptera of Europe